Kenneth Alexander Satterfield (born April 10, 1981) is an American professional basketball player, formerly in the National Basketball Association (NBA). He played for the Cincinnati Bearcats beginning in 1999. In 2001, after a successful sophomore season, he bolted for the NBA, being drafted 53rd overall (2nd round) by the Dallas Mavericks of the 2001 NBA draft. He played for the Denver Nuggets (2001–2002) and the Philadelphia 76ers (December 2002 – 2003).

During his time with the Nuggets, he coined the nickname "Birdman" for teammate Chris Andersen.

Satterfield posted NBA career averages of 4.3 points, 1.3 rebounds and 2.3 assists in a total of 75 games. Coincidentally, Satterfield's final NBA game ever was also his homecoming game against the Denver Nuggets. After leaving the Nuggets and joining the 76ers, his very first game against Denver at the Pepsi Center (Denver's arena) was on March 2, 2003, which ended up being his last game in the league. Philadelphia won the game 100 - 94 with Satterfield recording 2 assists but no points.

Satterfield a.k.a. "Serious Satellite" is also a well known streetball player on the basketball courts of the New York City summer leagues.

After his NBA venture, Satterfield had a stint with the now defunct NBDL's Fayetteville Patriots. He also played abroad in France, Greece, Venezuela and Lebanon, with Al Hikmeh Sagesse (in 2005-06), which he left in early 2006 without notice, and Riyadi Beirut.

In 2010, he played for the Albany Legends of the IBL. On April 30, 2010, he achieved a triple-double with 13 points, 12 rebounds, and 13 assists in a 100-106 loss to the Tacoma Tide. On May 22, 2010, he put up 31 points and 18 assists in a 142-124 win over the Holland Blast. He finished the season leading the team in points and assists. The Legends went on to win the 2010 IBL Championship.

Personal life
Satterfield's daughter Kae Satterfield plays for the Xavier University women's basketball team (sophomore during 2020-2021 season).

References

External links
Profile @ Eurobasket.com
Kenny Satterfield Interview @ Streetball.com
NBA player profile @ NBA.com
College & NBA stats @ basketballreference.com
Kenny Satterfield NBA Historical Player Profile @ NBA.com
Albany Legends Official Website @ iblhoopsonline.com

1981 births
Living people
African-American basketball players
American expatriate basketball people in Argentina
American expatriate basketball people in the Dominican Republic
American expatriate basketball people in France
American expatriate basketball people in Greece
American expatriate basketball people in Lebanon
American expatriate basketball people in Mexico
American expatriate basketball people in Venezuela
American men's basketball players
Basketball players from New York City
Bucaneros de Campeche players
Caballeros de Culiacán players
Ciclista Olímpico players
Cincinnati Bearcats men's basketball players
Dallas Mavericks draft picks
Denver Nuggets players
Fayetteville Patriots players
Guaiqueríes de Margarita players
Limoges CSP players
McDonald's High School All-Americans
Olympia Larissa B.C. players
Osaka Evessa players
Parade High School All-Americans (boys' basketball)
Philadelphia 76ers players
Point guards
Quimsa basketball players
Saitama Broncos players
Sagesse SC basketball players
21st-century African-American sportspeople
20th-century African-American people